The 1979 NASCAR Winston Cup Series was the 31st season of professional stock car racing in the United States and the 8th modern-era Cup series. It began on Sunday, January 14, and ended on Sunday, November 18. Richard Petty won his seventh and final Winston Cup championship, winning by 11 points over Darrell Waltrip. Dale Earnhardt was crowned NASCAR Rookie of the Year.

The season was the last until 2006 without Rusty Wallace.

Teams and drivers

Complete schedule

Limited schedule

Schedule

Races

Winston Western 500 

The 1979 Winston Western 500 was run on January 14 at Riverside International Raceway at Riverside, California. David Pearson won the pole.

Top Ten Results

 88–Darrell Waltrip
 21–David Pearson
 11–Cale Yarborough
 73–Bill Schmitt
 1–Donnie Allison
 72–Joe Millikan
 28–Buddy Baker
 51–Jim Thirkettle
 74–Tim Williamson
 12–Harry Gant

Busch Clash 

The inaugural Busch Clash, a non-points race for all of the pole winners from the previous season, was run on February 11 at Daytona International Speedway in Daytona Beach, Florida. Benny Parsons started on the pole via a random draw.

Results

 28–Buddy Baker
 88–Darrell Waltrip
 11–Cale Yarborough
 27–Benny Parsons
 15–Bobby Allison
 21–David Pearson
 54–Lennie Pond
 5–Neil Bonnett
 70–J. D. McDuffie

125 Mile Qualifying Races 

The two Daytona 500 125-mile qualifying races were run on February 15 at Daytona International Speedway in Daytona Beach, Florida. Buddy Baker and Donnie Allison started on the pole for races one and two, respectively.

Cale Yarborough was pessimistic about rivals' chances against Baker, saying "Baker is just pure horsepower."

Daytona 500 

The 21st annual Daytona 500 was run on February 18 at Daytona International Speedway in Daytona Beach, Florida. Buddy Baker won the pole. The race, the first televised nationally in its entirety, ended in spectacular fashion, as race leaders Donnie Allison and Cale Yarborough crashed on the last lap in turn three, allowing Richard Petty to take the lead and win his sixth Daytona 500. During the cool-down lap, Allison and Yarborough got into a heated argument which later escalated into a fist-fight, which was later joined by Bobby Allison, who stepped in to try to defend his brother. TV ratings were bolstered that day due to much of the U.S. Northeast being snowed in by a major blizzard. Petty would use the win as a springboard to his seventh and final championship, but it was going to be anything but easy.

Top Ten Results

 43–Richard Petty
 88–Darrell Waltrip
 51–A. J. Foyt
 1–Donnie Allison
 11–Cale Yarborough
 30–Tighe Scott
 68–Chuck Bown
 2–Dale Earnhardt
 14–Coo Coo Marlin
 79–Frank Warren

Carolina 500 

The 1979 Carolina 500 was run on March 4 at North Carolina Motor Speedway in Rockingham, North Carolina. Bobby Allison won the pole, but the story was Cale Yarborough and Donnie Allison, who crashed out of the lead on lap 10 in a wreck that swept up five other cars.

Top Ten Results

 15–Bobby Allison
 72–Joe Millikan
 05–Dick Brooks
 30–Tighe Scott
 3–Richard Childress
 40–D. K. Ulrich
 48–James Hylton
 37–Dave Watson
 79–Frank Warren
 27–Benny Parsons

Richmond 400 

The 1979 Richmond 400 was run on March 11 at Richmond Fairgrounds Raceway in Richmond, Virginia.  The race had been postponed from its original date of February 25.  Bobby Allison won the pole.

Top Ten Results

 11–Cale Yarborough
 15–Bobby Allison
 88–Darrell Waltrip
 27–Benny Parsons
 43–Richard Petty
 72–Joe Millikan
 70–J. D. McDuffie
 44–Terry Labonte
 1–Donnie Allison
 40–D. K. Ulrich

Atlanta 500 

The 1979 Atlanta 500 was run on March 18 at Atlanta International Raceway in Hampton, Georgia. Buddy Baker won the pole and after a late yellow got tires and stormed away from Bobby Allison for his first win since May 1976.  The race was marred by the death of pit crew member Dennis Wade, who was struck and killed on pit road by Dave Watson.

Top Ten Results

 28–Buddy Baker
 15–Bobby Allison
 88–Darrell Waltrip
 11–Cale Yarborough
 27–Benny Parsons
 02–Dave Marcis
 1–Donnie Allison
 72–Joe Millikan
 90–Ricky Rudd
 05–Dick Brooks

Northwestern Bank 400 

The 1979 Northwestern Bank 400 was run on March 25 at North Wilkesboro Speedway in North Wilkesboro, North Carolina. Benny Parsons won the pole.

Top Ten Results

 15–Bobby Allison
 43–Richard Petty
 27–Benny Parsons
 2–Dale Earnhardt
 88–Darrell Waltrip
 70–J. D. McDuffie
 3–Richard Childress
 28–Buddy Baker
 11–Cale Yarborough
 72–Joe Millikan

Southeastern 500 

The 1979 Southeastern 500 was run on April 1 at Bristol International Raceway in Bristol, Tennessee. Buddy Baker won the pole.

Top Ten Results

 2–Dale Earnhardt
 15–Bobby Allison
 88–Darrell Waltrip
 43–Richard Petty
 27–Benny Parsons
 1–Donnie Allison
 44–Terry Labonte
 72–Joe Millikan
 48–James Hylton
 90–Ricky Rudd

This was Dale Earnhardt's first Winston Cup career victory (and was a then-record for fewest races to 1st win in Cup Series, with Dale winning in just his 16th Cup start)

CRC Chemicals Rebel 500 

The 1979 CRC Chemicals Rebel 500 was run on April 8 at Darlington Raceway in Darlington, South Carolina. Donnie Allison won the pole.

Top Ten Results

 88–Darrell Waltrip
 43–Richard Petty
 1–Donnie Allison
 27–Benny Parsons
 28–Buddy Baker
 11–Cale Yarborough
 9–Bill Elliott
 90–Ricky Rudd
 05–Dick Brooks
 72–Joe Millikan

Waltrip won this race following a fierce duel with Richard Petty; they exchanged the lead eight times in the final five laps and three times on the last lap alone.
This was also David Pearson's last race with the Wood Brothers, for whom he had driven the #21 Mercury since 1972. Following a tire-change pit stop, Pearson reached the pit road exit, when two tires came off his car (the lug nuts had not been tightened when he left the pits). Within a week, Pearson was fired from the team and replaced by Neil Bonnett.

Virginia 500 

The 1979 Virginia 500 was run on April 22 at Martinsville Speedway in Martinsville, Virginia. Darrell Waltrip won the pole.

Top Ten Results

 43–Richard Petty
 28–Buddy Baker
 88–Darrell Waltrip
 15–Bobby Allison
 72–Joe Millikan
 47–Harry Gant
 48–James Hylton
 2–Dale Earnhardt
 44–Terry Labonte
 70–J. D. McDuffie

 This was Petty's first win on a short track since 1975 and his first win in a Chevrolet.
 Neil Bonnett, in his first start driving for Wood Brothers Racing after longtime driver David Pearson was fired, finished 25th after blowing an engine on lap 207.

Winston 500 

The 1979 Winston 500 was run on May 6 at Alabama International Motor Speedway in Talladega, Alabama. Darrell Waltrip won the pole.

Top Ten Results

 15–Bobby Allison
 88–Darrell Waltrip
 67–Buddy Arrington
 43–Richard Petty
 72–Joe Millikan
 9–Bill Elliott
 64–Tommy Gale
 79–Frank Warren
 44–Terry Labonte
 14–Coo Coo Marlin

 A 17-car crash erupted on the fourth lap when race-leader Baker blew a tire; Cale Yarborough came to a stop and got out of his car, then was hit by Dave Marcis' car, momentarily losing feeling in his legs; he recovered later that day.

Sun-Drop Music City USA 420 

The 1979 Sun-Drop Music City USA 420 was run on May 12 at Nashville Speedway in Nashville, Tennessee. Joe Millikan won the pole.

Top Ten Results

 11–Cale Yarborough
 43–Richard Petty
 15–Bobby Allison
 2–Dale Earnhardt
 70–J. D. McDuffie
 3–Richard Childress
 27–Benny Parsons
 28–Buddy Baker
 44–Terry Labonte
 90–Ricky Rudd

Race notes

The finish was marred by controversy.  Richard Petty and Bobby Allison asserted that Cale Yarborough was a lap down at the finish.  Petty said, "He lost one lap when he spun (with J. D. McDuffie), then he lost another when he spent 22 seconds in the pits."  Allison agreed, saying, "Richard won this race and I finished second.  I don't know how they had Cale winning."

Mason-Dixon 500 

The 1979 Mason-Dixon 500 was run on May 20 at Dover Downs International Speedway in Dover, Delaware. Darrell Waltrip won the pole.

Top Ten Results

 21–Neil Bonnett
 11–Cale Yarborough
 28–Buddy Baker
 15–Bobby Allison
 2–Dale Earnhardt
 44–Terry Labonte
 27–Benny Parsons
 72–Joe Millikan
 12–Lennie Pond
 67–Buddy Arrington

World 600 

The 1979 World 600 was run on May 27 at Charlotte Motor Speedway in Concord, North Carolina. Neil Bonnett won the pole.

Top Ten Results

 88–Darrell Waltrip
 43–Richard Petty
 2–Dale Earnhardt
 11–Cale Yarborough
 27–Benny Parsons
 90–Ricky Rudd
 44–Terry Labonte
 7–Al Holbert
 12–Lennie Pond
 3–Richard Childress

The race saw 59 lead changes, a still-standing track record.

Texas 400 

The 1979 Texas 400 was run on June 3 at Texas World Speedway in College Station, Texas. Buddy Baker won the pole.  It was NASCAR's first visit to the track in College Station, Texas since 1973; the track had closed in 1974 but reopened with USAC racing in 1976.

Top Ten Results

 88–Darrell Waltrip
 15–Donnie Allison
 28–Buddy Baker
 11–Cale Yarborough
 44–Terry Labonte
 43–Richard Petty
 3–Richard Childress
 72–Joe Millikan
 67–Buddy Arrington
 48–James Hylton

NAPA Riverside 400 

The 1979 NAPA Riverside 400 was run on June 10 at Riverside International Raceway in Riverside, California. Dale Earnhardt won the pole.

 15–Bobby Allison
 88–Darrell Waltrip
 43–Richard Petty
 11–Cale Yarborough
 27–Benny Parsons
 3–Richard Childress
 70–J. D. McDuffie
 93–Norm Palmer
 67–Buddy Arrington
 72–Joe Millikan

Gabriel 400 

The 1979 Gabriel 400 was run on June 17 at Michigan International Speedway in Brooklyn, Michigan. Neil Bonnett won the pole.

Top Ten Results

 28–Buddy Baker
 1–Donnie Allison
 11–Cale Yarborough
 21–Neil Bonnett
 43–Richard Petty
 2–Dale Earnhardt
 15–Bobby Allison
 90–Ricky Rudd
 30–Tighe Scott
 05–Dick Brooks

 The lead changed 47 times among 11 drivers.  Dale Earnhardt was criticized by Darrell Waltrip and Richard Petty when he nearly spun out trying to pass Neil Bonnett late in the race in front of both ("He nearly took us all out in the third turn," Waltrip said after the race).

Firecracker 400 

The 1979 Firecracker 400 was run on July 4 at Daytona International Speedway in Daytona Beach, Florida. Buddy Baker won the pole.

Top Ten Results

 21–Neil Bonnett
 27–Benny Parsons
 2–Dale Earnhardt
 88–Darrell Waltrip
 43–Richard Petty
 68–Chuck Bown
 47–Harry Gant
 72–Joe Millikan
 05–Dick Brooks
 51–A. J. Foyt

Busch Nashville 420 

The 1979 Busch Nashville 420 was run on July 14 at Nashville Speedway in Nashville, Tennessee. Darrell Waltrip won the pole.

Top Ten Results

 88–Darrell Waltrip
 11–Cale Yarborough
 2–Dale Earnhardt
 27–Benny Parsons
 43–Richard Petty
 48–James Hylton
 3–Richard Childress
 70–J. D. McDuffie
 25–Ronnie Thomas
 52–Jimmy Means

Coca-Cola 500 

The 1979 Coca-Cola 500 was run on July 30 at Pocono International Raceway in Long Pond, Pennsylvania. Initially scheduled for July 29, day-long rains forced postponement. Harry Gant won the pole.

Top Ten Results

 11–Cale Yarborough
 43–Richard Petty
 28–Buddy Baker
 27–Benny Parsons
 90–Ricky Rudd
 72–Joe Millikan
 22–Darrell Waltrip
 21–Neil Bonnett
 15–Bobby Allison
 30–Tighe Scott

Race notes

The lead changed a still-standing track record 55 times.
Dale Earnhardt suffered broken collar bones in a bad crash in Turn Two.
Darrell Waltrip lost five spots when he pitted under yellow with four to go for tires but the race never restarted. It cost him 19 points, a margin he would regret at the end of the season.

Talladega 500 

The 1979 Talladega 500 was run on August 5 at Alabama International Motor Speedway in Talladega, Alabama. Neil Bonnett won the pole.

Top Ten Results

 88–Darrell Waltrip
 2–David Pearson
 90–Ricky Rudd
 43–Richard Petty
 77–Jody Ridley
 30–Tighe Scott
 47–Harry Gant
 67–Buddy Arrington
 42–Kyle Petty
 3–Richard Childress

This was David Pearson's first race after leaving the Wood Brothers. Pearson was hired to drive the #2 temporarily after Dale Earnhardt's injury.

Champion Spark Plug 400 

The 1979 Champion Spark Plug 400 was run on August 19 at Michigan International Speedway in Brooklyn, Michigan. David Pearson won the pole.

Top Ten Results

 43–Richard Petty
 28–Buddy Baker
 27–Benny Parsons
 2–David Pearson
 08–John Anderson
 72–Joe Millikan
 90–Ricky Rudd
 30–Tighe Scott
 70–J. D. McDuffie
 3–Richard Childress

Blackie Wangerin flipped out of the track on lap 2.

Volunteer 500 

The 1979 Volunteer 500 was run on August 25 at Bristol International Raceway in Bristol, Tennessee. Richard Petty won the pole; it was his final pole as a driver and last for his racecar until 1996.

Top Ten Results

 88–Darrell Waltrip
 43–Richard Petty
 15–Bobby Allison
 27–Benny Parsons
 11–Cale Yarborough
 72–Joe Millikan
 2–David Pearson
 44–Terry Labonte
 90–Ricky Rudd
 17–Bill Elliott

Southern 500 

The 1979 Southern 500 was run on September 3 at Darlington Raceway in Darlington, South Carolina. Bobby Allison won the pole. David Pearson won the race for Rod Osterlund.

Top Ten Results

 2–David Pearson
 17–Bill Elliott
 44–Terry Labonte
 28–Buddy Baker
 27–Benny Parsons
 71–Dave Marcis
 05–Dick Brooks
 90–Ricky Rudd
 43–Richard Petty
 15–Bobby Allison
 Darrell Waltrip had over a lap lead when he had an accident. Darrell Waltrip had to make a pit stop which put David Pearson on the lead lap as well. Waltrip was passed by David Pearson and then involved in a second accident. David Pearson would win by 2 laps over second place.
 This was Pearson's last race for Osterlund because Dale Earnhardt was back for the Capital City 400 due to a crash at Pocono with rib injuries.
 This is the last race not featuring the Earnhardt name on the grid until the 2012 Charlotte fall race.

Capital City 400 

The 1979 Capital City 400 was run on September 9 at Richmond Fairgrounds Raceway in Richmond, Virginia. Dale Earnhardt won the pole.

Top Ten Results

 15–Bobby Allison
 88–Darrell Waltrip
 90–Ricky Rudd
 2–Dale Earnhardt
 11–Cale Yarborough
 43–Richard Petty
 71–Dave Marcis
 27–Benny Parsons
 47–Harry Gant
 72–Joe Millikan

CRC Chemicals 500 

The 1979 CRC Chemicals 500 was run on September 16 at Dover Downs International Speedway in Dover, Delaware. Dale Earnhardt won the pole.

Top Ten Results

 43–Richard Petty
 1–Donnie Allison
 11–Cale Yarborough
 28–Buddy Baker
 72–Joe Millikan
 15–Bobby Allison
 71–Dave Marcis
 90–Ricky Rudd
 2–Dale Earnhardt
 30–Tighe Scott

Old Dominion 500 

The 1979 Old Dominion 500 was run on September 23 at Martinsville Speedway in Martinsville, Virginia. Darrell Waltrip won the pole.

Top Ten Results

 28–Buddy Baker
 43–Richard Petty
 72–Joe Millikan
 15–Bobby Allison
 71–Dave Marcis
 90–Ricky Rudd
 67–Buddy Arrington
 11–Cale Yarborough
 44–Terry Labonte
 40–D. K. Ulrich

Waltrip blew his engine after leading 188 laps; the DiGard team changed engines in a record 11 minutes.  NASCAR outlawed mid-race engine changes after the 1979 season.

NAPA National 500 

The 1979 NAPA National 500 was run on October 7 at Charlotte Motor Speedway in Concord, North Carolina. Neil Bonnett won the pole; it was the thirteenth straight Charlotte pole for the Wood Brothers.

Top Ten Results

 11–Cale Yarborough
 15–Bobby Allison
 88–Darrell Waltrip
 43–Richard Petty
 1–Donnie Allison
 27–Benny Parsons
 9–Bill Elliott
 05–Dick Brooks
 40–D. K. Ulrich
 2–Dale Earnhardt

Holly Farms 400 

The 1979 Holly Farms 400 was run on October 14 at North Wilkesboro Speedway in North Wilkesboro, North Carolina.  The race had been postponed two weeks due to rain.  Dale Earnhardt won the pole.

Top Ten Results

 27–Benny Parsons
 15–Bobby Allison
 43–Richard Petty
 2–Dale Earnhardt
 90–Ricky Rudd
 44–Terry Labonte
 25–Ronnie Thomas
 40–D. K. Ulrich
 67–Buddy Arrington
 3–Richard Childress

 The story of the race was between Bobby Allison and Darrell Waltrip.  On lap 309 Waltrip sideswiped past Allison in turn 3; coming onto the frontstretch Allison hooked Waltrip head-on into the wall.  Benny Parsons took the lead at that point. Waltrip got repairs and under yellow began crowding Allison to the wall. NASCAR black-flagged Waltrip, but after pitting he went after Allison again.  NASCAR competition director Bill Gazaway went onto the track and personally waved another black flag to Waltrip, making sure Waltrip stayed out of the way of the leaders.  The wreck narrowed Waltrip's point lead over Richard Petty.

American 500 

The 1979 American 500 was run on October 21 at North Carolina Motor Speedway in Rockingham, North Carolina. Buddy Baker won the pole.

Top Ten Results

 43–Richard Petty
 27–Benny Parsons
 11–Cale Yarborough
 1–Donnie Allison
 2–Dale Earnhardt
 88–Darrell Waltrip
 3–Richard Childress
 25–Ronnie Thomas
 71–Dave Marcis
 51–Slick Johnson

With the win, Petty finished erasing a 229-point gap to Waltrip and led the points standings.

Dixie 500 

The 1979 Dixie 500 was run on November 4 at Atlanta International Raceway in Hampton, Georgia. Buddy Baker won the pole.

Top Ten Results

 21–Neil Bonnett
 2–Dale Earnhardt
 11–Cale Yarborough
 15–Bobby Allison
 88–Darrell Waltrip
 43–Richard Petty
 44–Terry Labonte
 90–Ricky Rudd
 72–Joe Millikan
 77–Jody Ridley

Waltrip took a two-point lead over Petty; it was the second straight race where the point lead changed hands.

Los Angeles Times 500 

The 1979 Los Angeles Times 500 was run on November 18 at Ontario Motor Speedway in Ontario, California. Cale Yarborough won the pole.

Top Ten Results

 27–Benny Parsons
 15–Bobby Allison
 11–Cale Yarborough
 28–Buddy Baker
 43–Richard Petty
 21–Neil Bonnett
 05–Dick Brooks
 88–Darrell Waltrip
 2–Dale Earnhardt
 90–Ricky Rudd

 Waltrip finished a lap down when he spun with John Rezek and pitted before the leaders did.  Richard Petty won the championship by 11 points, then the smallest margin of victory in NASCAR history and the first time in the sanctioning body's history the point lead changed hands in the final race.

Full Drivers’ Championship

(key) Bold – Pole position awarded by time. Italics – Pole position set by owner's points. * – Most laps led.

References

External links 
 Winston Cup Standings and Statistics for 1979

 

NASCAR Cup Series seasons